William H. Sumix (February 11, 1912 – February 27, 1978), often misnamed "Bill Summers" in sports publications, was an American professional basketball player. He played in the National Basketball League for the Hammond Ciesar All-Americans in one game during the 1940–41 season and scored two points.

References 

1912 births
1978 deaths
American men's basketball players
Basketball players from Akron, Ohio
Guards (basketball)
Hammond Ciesar All-Americans players
Sportspeople from Montgomery County, Pennsylvania